Joseph T. Ferguson (May 12, 1892October 22, 1979) was an American politician and perennial candidate from Ohio who participated in the Democratic Party. He served as Auditor of State for 18 years and as Treasurer of State of Ohio for 4 years.  His nickname was Jumpin' Joe. Both Ferguson and his son, Thomas E. Ferguson, served as Auditor of State of Ohio. From 1937 to 1995, the Ferguson dynasty held the position for 40 of the 58 years.

Career
Joseph T. Ferguson was born in Perry County in 1892. Not much is known about his private life. He ran unsuccessfully in 1928 for the Office of the Auditor of State of Ohio. His candidacy in 1936 was successful. He was re-elected three times as a result. In his fourth re-election in 1952, he suffered a defeat. Ferguson held the post of Auditor of State from 1937 to 1953.  During this time he ran in 1944 for the Democratic nomination for the office of President of the United States. He participated in 1944, 1960 and 1972 as a delegate to the Democratic National Conventions. In 1950, he ran unsuccessfully for a seat in the United States Senate. From 1959 to 1963, Ferguson was Treasurer of the State of Ohio. From 1971 to 1975 he then again held the post of Auditor of State of Ohio. After his death, he was buried at Saint Mary Cemetery in Lancaster, Ohio. (Ohio).

In 1974, the ACLU of Ohio filed a lawsuit against Ferguson, who was withholding state payments for abortions of state Welfare recipients. Roe v. Ferguson proceeded on Spetermber 16, 1974 in the United States District Court for the Southern District of Ohio.

Ferguson was a member of the Knights of Columbus, the Eagles, Moose, Grange, and the Benevolent and Protective Order of Elks.

References 

Ohio Democrats
1892 births
1979 deaths